Mark Bonner (born 23 November 1985) is a football manager who is currently the head coach of Cambridge United.

Coaching career
Bonner joined Cambridge United in June 2011, working in a number of positions in the club's academy. In January 2018, Bonner was named as first team coach, working under manager Shaun Derry and assistant Joe Dunne, taking over the role from Mick Halsall.

Following the departure of Derry in February 2018, Dunne took over as interim head coach with Bonner serving as his assistant head coach. Dunne and Bonner's roles were made permanent in May of that year following a successful interim spell. As results declined in the first half of the 2018-19 season, Dunne departed the club in December 2018 with Bonner taking over temporary charge of the first team, overseeing a defeat and a draw before Colin Calderwood was appointed later that month, with Bonner returning to his role as assistant head coach.

Calderwood's departure in January 2020 again saw Bonner take temporary charge of first team duties, overseeing four wins in his first four matches in charge. In March 2020, Bonner was named permanent head coach of Cambridge United on a two-year contract until the end of the 2021-22 season.

Due to the curtailing of the 2019–20 season caused by the COVID-19 pandemic, Bonner's first match as permanent head coach did not come for six months until Cambridge United knocked Championship side Birmingham City out of the first round of the 2020–21 EFL Cup.

Bonner's first full season as a manager was hugely successful for Cambridge United, both in team and personal honours. In September, he was named League Two Manager of the Month after an unbeaten start saw Cambridge United top of the league with seven points and without conceding a goal.  He won his second monthly award in January after an unbeaten month of three wins and two draws saw the U's return to the top of the table. Cambridge United continued their encouraging form into the final stretch of the season and, after spurning two chances to secure promotion with surprise losses to Stevenage and Harrogate Town, a 3–0 win at home to Grimsby Town saw them confirm a second placed finish, and promotion to League One for the first time since 2002.
On 10 May 2021, Bonner signed a new 3-year contract with the club.

Managerial statistics

initially caretaker and appointed permanently on 9 March 2020

Honours

Manager
Cambridge United
League Two runner-up: 2020–21

Individual
League Two Manager of the Month: September 2020, January 2021

References 

Cambridge United F.C. non-playing staff
Living people
Association football coaches
English football managers
Cambridge United F.C. managers
English Football League managers
1985 births